RKA Petroleum Companies, or simply RKA, formerly Leemon Oil Co, is a family-owned and operated corporation based in Romulus, Michigan. RKA employs an exceptional and expanding fleet operated by well-trained drivers who are focused on safe and round-the-clock fuel distribution. By working in partnership with customers, RKA has developed a wide range of fuel distribution solutions including delivering bulk fuel directly into customers’ tanks, providing on-site permanent or temporary fuel tanks, and fueling individual units, including equipment, tractors and/or reefers.

Products / Services 
 Gasoline
 Diesel: On-Road, Off-Road, and Biodiesel
 Diesel Exhaust Fluid (DEF)
 Ethanol
 Supply Contracts
 Fuel Management Programs (FMP)

Cross-industry Fuel Solutions 

 Trucking
 Commercial
 Fleet
 Logistics
 Manufacturing
 Mass Transit
 Construction
 Landscaping
 Generators
 Farm Fueling
 Utilities
RKA's fuel distribution network employs an exceptional and expanding fleet operated by well-trained drivers who are focused on safely delivering fuel products to the market 24 hours a day, seven days a week in Michigan and Ohio.

Gas Stations 
As a leading supplier of a wide network of gas stations for over 60 years, RKA offers several programs for companies wishing to develop a trademark for, or to brand their stations. From single store to a small chain enterprises, or a large corporations, RKA has the expertise and capability to build, brand and supply companies with whatever is necessary to build your business. Choose from several prominent, respected brands, including:

 Citgo
 Marathon
 Sunoco
 BP
 Arco 
 Amoco

Since 1956

Early 1950s – 1970s 
Hilmer Westphal Leemon started the Leemon Oil Company as a home heating oil delivery service with Pure Oil Company. Soon he expanded the business by adding a gas station and a small oil distribution plant in suburban Detroit.

1970s–2000s 
Roger K Albertie assumes control of the family business. Under his leadership and guidance RKA Petroleum expands into a multifaceted distributor supplying gasoline, diesel, jet and alternative fuels to local national and government agencies in over 29 states.

Today 
RKA continues to grow and prosper under the leadership of third generation family members who are dedicated to meeting the challenges of today's market while maintaining the RKA principals of quality and service to customers, that have been the mainstay of RKA's success for over 60 years.

References
RKA Petroleum Cos. official website
Petroleum Terminals Integrate Pre-Blended Biodiesel
RKA Petroleum First to Offer Cleaner, Cheaper, Biodiesel Technology
BQ9000 Companies

Automotive fuel retailers
Oil companies of the United States
Companies based in Wayne County, Michigan